SANAE is the South African National Antarctic Expedition. The name refers both to the overwintering bases (numbered in Roman numerals, e.g. SANAE IV), and the team spending the winter (numbered in Arabic numerals, e.g. SANAE 47). The current base, SANAE IV, is located at Vesleskarvet in Queen Maud Land, Antarctica. Summer teams comprise administrative and maintenance personnel, helicopter crew and scientists from various countries and can be up to 100 people. Overwintering teams consist of scientists and support personnel from South Africa, typically totalling 10 members in recent years.

The research programme at the SANAE IV base is carried out under the auspices of the South African National Antarctic Programme (SANAP).

History
The first expedition, SANAE 1, overwintered at Norway Station, taken over by South Africa from Norway after the end of the IGY. Later teams overwintered at SANAE I, SANAE II and SANAE III, built on the Fimbul Ice Shelf near the Blåskimen Island. Built on the moving ice shelf, these stations inevitably got buried, and eventually broke off as part of icebergs drifting away. Successive stations were always repositioned at the same geographical position of S 70º18 W 2º22. SANAE IV was built on the nunatak Vesleskarvet in the hope of having a base with a longer lifetime. The first team to overwinter at SANAE IV was SANAE 36 in 1997. The base has been manned uninterruptedly since then.

See also
 Crime in Antarctica
 South African National Antarctic Programme
 Gough Island
 Marion Island
 SA Agulhas
 SA Agulhas II
 List of Antarctic expeditions

References

External links
South African Research Station - Official website
Facebook Group - SANAE team discussions

Outposts of Queen Maud Land
South African National Antarctic Programme
Princess Martha Coast
1962 establishments in Antarctica